Sun Creature may refer to:

 Sun Creature (EP), a 1999 EP by Nebula
 Sun Creature Studio, a Danish animation studio